Denmark were the hosts of the Junior Eurovision Song Contest 2003, the first Junior Eurovision Song Contest held. Denmark was represented by Anne Gadegaard with "Arabiens drøm".

Before Junior Eurovision
In April 2000, Danmarks Radio launched a song contest for children aged 8 to 15. The idea drew the attention of Norway and Sweden in 2002, thus creating a pre-Scandinavian song contest entitled MGP Nordic. The European Broadcasting Union picked up on the format and launched a pan-European version in 2003, known as the Junior Eurovision Song Contest, with Denmark, Norway, and Sweden being three of the 16 participating countries.

MGP 2003 
Danmarks Radio (DR) held a national final to select the Danish national final for the first Junior Eurovision Song Contest, to be held in Denmark's capital Copenhagen. 10 songs competed in MGP 2003, held on 3 May and hosted by Camilla Ottesen and Gordon Kennedy.

The winner was chosen by 4 televoting regions and SMS voting in two rounds of voting - the first to select the top 5 and the second to select the winner. In the second round of voting, each televoting region awarded 4, 6, 8, 10 and 12 points to the remaining 5 songs, with the song receiving the most votes being the winner.

At Junior Eurovision
On the night of the contest Anne performed 13th in the running order of the contest, following the United Kingdom and preceding Sweden. At the close of the voting she received 93 points, placing 5th of the 16 competing entries.

Voting

References

Junior Eurovision Song Contest
Denmark
Junior